Persoonia stradbrokensis is a species of flowering plant in the family Proteaceae and is endemic to eastern Australia.

Description
Flowering mainly occurs from December to May and the fruit is a drupe.

Taxonomy
Persoonia stradbrokensis was first formally described in 1921 by Karel Domin in Bibliotheca Botanica from specimens he collected on Stradbroke Island in 1910.

Distribution and habitat
This geebung grows from coastal heath to forest in near-coastal areas of Australia between Tin Can Bay in south-eastern Queensland and the Hastings River in north-eastern New South Wales.

References

stradbrokensis
Flora of New South Wales
Flora of Queensland
Plants described in 1921
Taxa named by Karel Domin